In mathematical physics and gauge theory, the ADHM construction or monad construction is the construction of all instantons using methods of linear algebra by Michael Atiyah, Vladimir Drinfeld, Nigel Hitchin, Yuri I. Manin in their paper "Construction of Instantons."

ADHM data 
The ADHM construction uses the following data:

 complex vector spaces V and W of dimension k and N,
 k × k complex matrices B1, B2, a k × N complex matrix I and a N × k complex matrix J,
 a real moment map 
 a complex moment map 

Then the ADHM construction claims that, given certain regularity conditions,
 Given B1, B2, I, J such that , an anti-self-dual instanton in a SU(N) gauge theory with instanton number k can be constructed,
 All anti-self-dual instantons can be obtained in this way and are in one-to-one correspondence with solutions up to a U(k) rotation which acts on each B in the adjoint representation and on I and J via the fundamental and antifundamental representations
 The metric on the moduli space of instantons is that inherited from the flat metric on B,  I and J.

Generalizations

Noncommutative instantons
In a noncommutative gauge theory, the ADHM construction is identical but the moment map   is set equal to the self-dual projection of the noncommutativity matrix of the spacetime times the identity matrix.  In this case instantons exist even when the gauge group is U(1). The noncommutative instantons were discovered by  Nikita Nekrasov and Albert Schwarz in 1998.

Vortices
Setting B2 and J to zero, one obtains the classical moduli space of nonabelian vortices in a supersymmetric gauge theory with an equal number of colors and flavors, as was demonstrated in  Vortices, instantons and branes.  The generalization to greater numbers of flavors appeared in  Solitons in the Higgs phase: The Moduli matrix approach.  In both cases the Fayet–Iliopoulos term, which determines a squark condensate, plays the role of the noncommutativity parameter in the real moment map.

The construction formula 
Let x be the 4-dimensional Euclidean spacetime coordinates written in quaternionic notation

Consider the 2k × (N + 2k) matrix

Then the conditions  are equivalent to the factorization condition 
 where f(x) is a k × k Hermitian matrix.

Then a hermitian projection operator P can be constructed as 

The nullspace of Δ(x) is of dimension N for generic x. The basis vectors for this null-space can be assembled into an (N + 2k) × N matrix U(x) with orthonormalization condition U†U = 1.

A regularity condition on the rank of Δ guarantees the completeness condition 

The anti-selfdual connection is then constructed from U by the formula

See also
Monad (linear algebra)
Twistor theory

References

Hitchin, N.  (1983), "On the Construction of Monopoles", Commun. Math. Phys. 89, 145–190.

Gauge theories
Differential geometry
Quantum chromodynamics